John Davies Cox (born 31 December 1870) was an English international footballer, who played as a right half.

Career
Born in Spondon, Cox played professionally for Derby County, and earned one cap for England in 1892.

References

External links

1870 births
Year of death missing
English footballers
England international footballers
Derby County F.C. players
English Football League players
Association football midfielders
Footballers from Derby
People from Spondon
FA Cup Final players